Zen institutions have an elaborate system of ranks and hierarchy, which determine one's position in the institution. Within this system, novices train to become a Zen priest, or a trainer of new novices.

Sōtō
From its beginnings, Sōtō Zen has placed a strong emphasis on lineage and dharma transmission. In time, dharma transmission became synonymous with the transmission of temple ownership. This was changed by Manzan Dokahu (1636–1714), a Sōtō reformer, who...

Sōtō-Zen has two ranking systems, hōkai (four dharma ranks) and sōkai (eight priest ranks).

Hōkai
The dharma ranks (法階) point to the stages in the training to become an Oshō, priest or "technologist of the spirit". To become a dai-Oshō, priest of a Zen-temple, one has to follow the training in an officially recognized training centre, sōdō-ango (僧堂安居).

Jōza (上座) 
Becoming a Sōtō-Zen priest starts with shukke tokudo (出家得度). In this ceremony, the novice receives his outfit ("inner and outer robes, belts, o-kesa, rakusu, kechimyaku (transmission chart) and eating bowls") and takes the precepts. One is then an Unsui, a training monk. This gives the rank of jōza, except for children under ten years old, who are called sami.

Zagen (座元) 
The next step, after one has been a monk for at least three years, is risshin (立身) and hossen-shiki (Dharma combat ceremony), while acting as a shuso (首座), headmonk, during a retreat. Risshin is "To raise one's body into a standing position":

Hossenshiki is a ceremony in which questions and answers are exchanged. After this ceremony, one is promoted to the rank of zagen.

Oshō

Shihō (嗣法) 
The third step is shihō, or denpo, dharma transmission. Dharma transmission is...

Shihō is done "one-to-one in the abbot's quarters (hojo)". Three handwritten documents certify the dharma transmission;

The procedure has to take place only once in one's life, and binds the student to the teacher forever:

If a student does not have the feeling he wants to be tied to this teacher for the rest of his life, he may refuse to take dharma transmission from this particular teacher. Since the time of Manzan Dokahu (1636–1714), multiple dharma transmissions are impossible in Sōtō Zen.

In contrast to the status that dharma transmission has acquired in the west, in Japanese Sōtō it has a relatively low status:

Dharma transmission is not seen then as the end of the road; instead, it marks the beginning of deeper learning:

Ten-e (転衣)
To become an oshō, teacher, two more steps are to be taken, ten-e and zuise.

Ten-e means "to turn the robe":

Zuise (瑞世) 
The literal meaning of Zuise is as follows:

Zuise is also called ichiya-no-jūshoku(一夜住職), "abbot for one night". In this ceremony, one is literally abbot for one night.

The ceremony originates in the medieval organisation of the Sōtō-shū, when rotation of abbotship was the norm. Dharma transmission at a branch temple obliged one to serve at least one term as abbot at the main temple. Abbotship gave severe duties, and financial burdens, for which reason many tried to avoid the responsibility of abbotship:

The ceremony has to be done at both Eihei-ji and Sōji-ji, the main temples of the Sōtõ school, within the time span of one month. This originates in the rivalry between Eihei-ji and Sōji-ji. Eihei-ji's attempts to gain dominance were met with resistance from Sōji-ji. Several times in history Sōji-ji "has issued proclamations that anyone who received honors at Eihei-ji would never be allowed back at a temple affiliated with Sōji-ji". Since Sōji-ji has by far the largest network of temples, this was an effective mean to limit the influence of Eihei-ji.

After zuise one becomes an Oshō, i.e. "priest" or "teacher".

Dai-oshō (大和尚)
After having become oshō one may become a dai-oshō, resident priest in a Zen-temple. It takes further training in a sōdō-ango, an officially recognized Sōtō-shū training centre.

A prerequisite to become dai-oshō is to do ango, "to stay in peace" or "safe shelter". It is derived from ancient Indian Buddhism, when monks retreated into shelter during the rain-season. Ango is a period of 90 or 100 days of intensive practice. There is no fixed stage on the training-path when ango has to be done, but ordination as a monk is necessary, and it has to be done in a sōdō-ango. The aspirant dai-oshō has to spend at least six months there, but one or two years is the usual span of time. Ango is necessary because it "grinds" the future dai-oshō:

Ango (安居) helps to become a mature person:

After ango one can start to work in a temple. The newly acquired status is confirmed in the kyōshi-honin ceremony. There-after follows the first practice-period in one's own temple, with the aid of a susho (head monk). This is followed by the Jūshoku-himei ceremony, which confirms one's status as dai-oshō.

Shike (師家) 
To supervise the training of monks, further qualification is necessary:

There are two grades for training supervisor, namely shike and jun shike. Appointment as shike is done by cooptation:

Sōkai
Promotion in priest-rank depends（僧階） on school education and amount of time spend in monastery training. There are eight ranks:

Kaikyōshi
A special title, Kaikyōshi（開教使）, was created for foreign practitioners, which is not being used anymore, but replaced by the title Kokusai Fukyōshi.

Rinzai
At Myōshin-ji, two kinds of ranking systems are being used to rank sōryo ("a member of the educated clergy, a priest, as opposed to a monk", namely the hokai (dharma rank) and the Tokyū-class system.

Hōkai
The hōkai (dharma rank) system is used to denote ranks in the Buddhist clerical career hierarchy. It has fourteen ranks and titles, starting with the shami rank. A central, but temporary phase in this career is the stay in a monastery for a few years. Half of the jūshoku (priests) connected to Myōshin-ji stayed there less than two years, and 10% even shorter than one year. The stay at the monastery is meant to learn the skills and social role necessary to function as a priest:

Shami
Ordination, called tokudo-shiki, usually takes place at a young age, between 6 and 20. Most of the ordained are temple sons, and often no special value is given to the ceremony. The time since ordination is the hōrō seniority, which is one of the factors in obtaining Tokyū-grades.

Lay-ordination into the Rinzai-school takes place through the jukai.

Jūshoku
The suiji-shiki ceremony is performed when one has finished the formal training period and is ready to start as assistant-priest, "often one's father temple". hereby one gains the rank of oshō, priest.

In the Rinzai-school, a difference is made between acknowledgement of insight and succession in the organisation:

The most common form of transmission in Rinzai Zen is the acknowledgement that one has stayed in the monastery for a certain amount of time, and may later become a temple priest.

After finishing the koan-study, further practice is necessary:

Shike
Three of the highest ranks are shike ("Zen master" (of the training hall)), rekijō and tokujūshoku (kancō, abbot).

According to roshi Sokun Tsushimoto, the title of shike  is equivalent to Zen master and roshi:

The shike has received inka-shōmei or dharma transmission. Inka-shōmei is used for the transmission of the "true lineage" of the masters (shike) of the training halls. There are only about fifty to eighty of such inka-shōmei bearers in Japan:

Inka is usually attested by a written document:

According to roshi Sokun Tsushimoto,

But according to Mohr, 

The shike is not married. He...

The shike is also the head of the sect (subschool of the Rinzai-school, with its own head temple). He appoints and dismisses the priests, and appoints the titles in the ranking system. Yet, "the position as abbot [at Myōshinji] is based on election, each elected period lasting four years".

Tokyū
The Tokyū-class system is a teacher-grade system. Up to the second grade, progressing takes place through taking exams, or through mushiken kentei, authorization without examination. Age, seniority, amount of practice in the sodo, and educational level play a part in this authorization:

A 'part-time' career program is offered by the ange-o-system, aimed at persons wishing to become full-time or part-time temple-priest, who don't have the opportunity to spend the required years in the sōdō.

Besides the official ranking, several honorific titles are being used:
 Oshō ("virtuous monk") is being used for an educated teacher (kyōshi) above Zendōshoku rank, "which most persons acquire by having spent a time in the monastery" Osho-san is used with respect and affection.
 Dai-Osho is not commonly used in Rinzai priesthood. It is respectfully used for deceased priests. 
 Daizenji ("great master") is attached to the Oshō-title when someone has the Zenjūshoku or Dai kyōshi rank.
 Rōshi is used for a teacher of dai kyōshi grade, but also for older teachers. In the west the title rōshi has acquired the meaning of "enlightened Zen master".

Sanbo Kyodan
The Sanbo Kyodan is a lay lineage mixing Soto and Rinzai-elements. Students in this school follow the Harada-Yasutani koan curriculum, in which great emphasis is placed on kensho, the initial insight into one's true nature. Having attained kensho is publicly acknowledged in a jahai-ceremony. After working through the Harada-Yasutani koan curriculum, which may take as short as five years, the student receives a calligraphy testifying that he or she "has finished the great matter". This is publicly acknowledged in the hasansai-ceremony, giving the status of hasan.

The Sanbo Kyodan has two levels of teaching authority, namely junshike ("associate zen master"), and shōshike ("authentic zen master"). Junshikes can give dokusan, authorize kensho, and supervise part of the koan-study. Shoshikes can supervise the advanced koan-study, and perform religious ceremonies, such as the precept-ceremony and wedding ceremonies.

The process toward gaining these titles has seen some variations within the Sanbo Kyodan. Hasansai may be preparatory to the junshike-title, but may also be the promotion to this title. And promotion to shoshike may be preparatory to dharma transmission, but may also be equivalent to it.

In dharma transmission, the student receives the sanmotsu, in a lay version of the Soto shiho ceremony. This is coupled with the Rinzai notion on inka. In Rinzai, only ordained priests who have completed the complete Rinzai koan curriculum and "are eligible to serve as sōdō roshi, that is, master of a training hall, in distinction from a common temple, receive inka. In the Sanbo Kyodan, inka is derived from Harada's Rinzai master Dokutan Sōsan.

White Plum Asanga
The White Plum Asanga, consisting of Dharma heirs of Taizan Maezumi, recognizes denkai, transmission of the Bodhisattva Precepts, in advance of dharma transmission:

This precept-transmission has a long history in Sōtō-shu. Keizan, the fourth Sōtō-patriarch, received transmission of the precepts from Gien, the third (actually fourth) abbot of Eihei-ji, but received dharma transmission from Tettsū Gikai, the disputed third abbot of Enheiji. According to Keizan's Denkoroku, Dogen had received Dharma transmission from Rujing, bur precept transmission via the Rinzai-linegae of Myozen, with whom he first studied.

In the White Plum Asanga, Dharma transmission precedes inka, and qualifies one as a sensei. This may be followed by inka, the final acknowledgemment:

Kwan Um
The Kwan Um School of Zen (관음선종회) (KUSZ) is an international school of Zen centers and groups, founded in 1983 by Seung Sahn Soen Sa Nim.

There are four kinds of teachers in the Kwan Um tradition, all having attained a varying degree of mastery and understanding.
 A Dharma teacher is an individual that has taken the Five precepts and Ten precepts, completed a minimum of four years of training and a minimum of eight weekend retreats, understood basic Zen teaching and has been confirmed by a Soen Sa Nim (Zen master) to receive the title. These individuals can give a Dharma talk but may not respond to audience questions.
 A senior Dharma teacher is a Dharma teacher who, after a minimum of five years, has been confirmed by a Soen Sa Nim and has taken the Sixteen precepts. These individuals are given greater responsibility than a Dharma teacher, are able to respond to questions during talks, and give consulting interviews.
 A Ji Do Poep Sa Nim (JDPSN; Dharma master; jido beopsa-nim;) is an authorized individual that has completed kong-an training (having received inka), and is capable of leading a retreat. The nominee must demonstrate an aptitude for the task of teaching, showing the breadth of their understanding in their daily conduct, and undergo a period of teacher training.
 A Soen Sa Nim (Zen master; seonsa-nim;) is a JDPSN that has received full Dharma transmission master to master.

An Abbot serves a Zen center in an administrative capacity, and does not necessarily provide spiritual direction, though several are Soen Sa Nims. These individuals take care of budgets and other such tasks.

Criticism
The hierarchical system of Zen has attracted severe criticism in the west, because of the misconception of the role and degree of awakening of Zen teachers. The term rōshi has been applied to implicate a certified state of awakening, implying impeccable moral behaviour. Actual practice shows that this has not always been the case.

See also
 Dharma transmission
 Zen master
 Rōshi
 Japanese honorifics

Notes

References

Web references

Sources

Further reading

External links
Training
 Uchiyama Kôshô Rôshi: To you who has decided to become a Zen monk
 Married monks?
 Fr. Kevin Hunt: Becoming a Zen Teacher
 The Formation of Sōtō Zen Priests in the West, A Dialogue
 James Ishmael Ford: Bodhisattva Ordination, Leadership Reform, and the Role of Zen Clerics in Japan
Criticism
 Waking up to Sōtō Zen Hierarchy
 Fundamentally No Hierarchy?
 Sex, sake and Zen
 Online Zen-priest ordination
History of Zen
 thezensite

Zen
Zen Buddhist spiritual teachers
Zen sects